Carly Aquilino (born November 18, 1990) is an American stand-up comedian, actress, television host and television personality. Aquilino was a regular cast member of the Girl Code comedy series on MTV and was a host of Girl Code Live.

Biography 
Aquilino was born on Long Island, New York and worked as a hairdresser. She needed spinal surgery and recuperated for a year during which time she realized she couldn't work on her feet as a hairdresser. She started doing standup and was discovered at the Carolines comedy club by Ryan Ling. She got a job with Girl Code from this encounter. As of 2019, she was hosting a podcast with Emma Willman called Secret Keepers Club. She has made appearances on Uncommon Sense with Charlamagne, the Jim Gaffigan Show, The Playboy Morning Show and Hot Ones.

References

External links

 

Living people
1990 births
American women comedians
American television talk show hosts
American people of Italian descent
21st-century American comedians
21st-century American women